The 2018 World Seniors Championship was a snooker tournament, taking place at the Baths Hall in Scunthorpe, England, from 21 to 24 March 2018. Qualifying for the tournament was open to non-tour players, aged 40 and over on 1 January 2018. In addition to the winner's cheque the champion received a place in the qualifying tournament for the 2018 World Snooker Championship.

Peter Lines won the 2017 edition with a 4–0 victory against John Parrott in the final, but as a tour player he was not eligible for this year's edition. Three of the eight seeded participants withdrew prior to the tournament. The five remaining seeds were defeated in the opening round. The Championship was won by Aaron Canavan, who beat Patrick Wallace 4–3 in the final.

Prize fund 
The breakdown of the tournament prizes is shown below:
 Winner: £10,000 and a place in WC qualifying
 Runner-up: £3,000
 Semi-finalist: £1,500
 Quarter-finalist: £500
 Highest break: £500
 Total: £18,500

Field

Seeded players
Players were seeded based on the titles won during their professional careers:

  Stephen Hendry – 7 world titles (1990, 1992–96, 1999), 18 triple crown titles
  John Parrott – 1 world title (1991), 2 triple crown titles, 9 ranking titles. Replaced by  Lee Richardson, sixth in the amateur rankings
  Joe Johnson – 1 world title (1986), 1 triple crown title
  Dennis Taylor – 1 world title (1985), 2 triple crown titles, 2 ranking titles
  Tony Drago – 1 ranking final (1997). Replaced by  Simon Dent, fourth in the amateur rankings
  Tony Knowles – 2 ranking titles (1982, 1983)
  Cliff Thorburn – 1 world title (1980), 4 triple crown titles, 2 ranking titles
  Willie Thorne – 1 ranking title (1985). Replaced by  Gary Filtness, the highest ranked amateur

Qualifying
Eight qualifying events for the 2018 World Seniors Championship took place during the World Seniors Tour 2017/2018:

 13–15 October: Crucible Sports & Social Club, Newbury, England (World Q1)
 Qualifier:  Jonathan Bagley
 27–29 October: Terry Griffiths Matchroom, Llanelli, Wales (World Q2)
 Qualifier:  Rhydian Richards
 17–19 November: The Ballroom, Glasgow, Scotland (World Q3)
 Qualifier:  Patrick Wallace
 1–3 December: Pot Black Lowestoft, Lowestoft, England (World Q4)
 Qualifier:  Barry Pinches
 15–17 December: Dunstable Snooker Centre, Dunstable, England (World Q5)
 Qualifier:  Aaron Canavan
 26–28 January: CBSA World Snooker Academy, Beijing, China (World Q6)
 Qualifier:  Cao Kaisheng
 22–25 February: Northern Snooker Centre, Leeds, England (World Q7)
 Qualifier:  David Lilley. Replaced by the runner-up of the event,  Nick Spelman
 9–11 March: D’Arcy McGees at Spawell, Dublin, Republic of Ireland (World Q8)
 Qualifier:  John Farrell

Each qualifier took their place alongside invited players and replacements in the main draw of the championship.

Main draw 

 All matches were played with a 30-second shot clock with players having two time-outs per match
 *Re-spotted black ball replaced final frame deciders

Final

References 

2018
World Seniors Tour
2018 in snooker
2018 in English sport
Sport in Scunthorpe
World Seniors Championship